Geoff Smith (23 September 1942 – 8 October 2018) was an Australian cyclist. He competed in the tandem event at the 1960 Summer Olympics.

References

External links
 

1942 births
2018 deaths
Australian male cyclists
Olympic cyclists of Australia
Cyclists at the 1960 Summer Olympics
Place of birth missing